The FIDE World Chess Championship 1998 was contested in a match between the FIDE World Champion Anatoly Karpov and the challenger Viswanathan Anand. The match took place between 2 January and 9 January 1998 in Lausanne, Switzerland. The challenger was determined in a tournament held in Groningen, Netherlands, between 9 December and 30 December 1997. After the championship match ended in a draw, Karpov won the rapid playoff, becoming the 1998 FIDE World Chess Champion.

New World Championship format

Background

From 1948 to 1993, the world chess championship had been administered by FIDE, the international chess federation. In 1993, World Chess Champion Garry Kasparov split from FIDE and formed a rival organisation, the Professional Chess Association. FIDE stripped Kasparov of his title, meaning there were now two rival championships: the FIDE title, held by Anatoly Karpov, and the PCA title, held by Kasparov. Karpov and Kasparov had successfully defended their titles at the FIDE World Chess Championship 1996 and PCA World Chess Championship 1995 respectively.

From 1948 until 1996, World Chess Championships had followed a similar pattern: a series of qualifying tournaments and matches were held over more than a year, culminating in the Candidates Tournament. The winner of the Candidates tournament was the official challenger for the world title and would play the incumbent champion in a match for world championship. (The 1996 cycle was an exception. The incumbent world champion participated in the Candidates tournament as a seeded semi-finalist.)

In 1997, FIDE president Kirsan Ilyumzhinov proposed a completely new structure: a knockout tournament, consisting of two-game matches (slightly longer in the final rounds), with match tie-breakers using rapid chess and blitz chess if necessary. This format had been done before in tournaments such as Tilburg 1992–94, but never at the world championship level.

In addition to the new format, it was proposed by Ilyumzhinov as a way to unify the two rival world titles. To do this, FIDE champion Anatoly Karpov and PCA champion Garry Kasparov were each to be seeded into the semi-finals.

Kasparov did not want to defend his title under these circumstances and declined his invitation.  The format was then modified to have FIDE champion Karpov seeded directly into the final.

Controversies

The advantages of the new format were:
 It avoided a long cycle, and was all over in a month or so. This is could all be done in the one venue, it would not have the scheduling problems which had beset some previous world championship cycles. Each round could be played in 3 days (one day for each normal time control game, and one for the tie breaks).
 More players (up to 128) could be included.
 There were no special privileges for the incumbent champion or seeded players (although some were preserved in the earlier championships, these were eliminated later on).

Opponents pointed out disadvantages of the format:
 Short matches (only two games in the earlier rounds) left too much to chance – the stronger player could blunder a game, and it would be difficult to recover from a bad start. (Many world championship and Candidates matches had been won by the player who recovered from an early loss).
 The rapid playoffs were also seen to be left too much to chance: strength in rapid chess is not the same as strength in chess with normal time controls.
 These first two considerations, taken together, meant there was a very high chance that the best player would not win, or even that a complete outsider might win, opponents argued.
 Some people felt that the tradition of the champion being seeded into the final should be preserved, so that a new champion can only be champion by defeating the old champion.
 However, the scheduling of the match caused great controversy regarding the fairness of the contest: Anand was forced to play a fresh and prepared Karpov a mere three days after his exhausting performance at Groningen.

Prominent non-participants

 Kasparov did not want to defend his title under these circumstances, and declined his invitation.
 Vladimir Kramnik declined to play, in protest against having the final with Karpov shortly after the end of the tournament.

Participants
All players are grandmasters unless indicated otherwise.

1 Kramnik (ranked 2nd in the world) declined participation on the grounds that Karpov's direct entry into the final was unacceptable.

2 Mohammed did not appear.

Garry Kasparov (ranked 1st in the world), Gata Kamsky (ranked 7th), and Zsuzsa Polgar (Women's world champion) declined participation in advance.

Karpov as defending FIDE champion was seeded directly into the championship match. Of the 97 remaining participants, 68 entered the tournament in the first round, 28 in the second round and 1 (Gelfand, loser from Round 3 of the previous Candidates match) in the third round.

Results, rounds 1-4

Section 1

Section 2

Section 3

Section 4

Section 5

Section 6

Section 7

Section 8

Results, rounds 5–7

Championship match

The match was played over 6 games in Lausanne, Switzerland (on January 2-3-4 and 6-7-8) and ended in a 3–3 tie. Two rapid games were then played on January 9. Karpov won both, retaining his FIDE title.

{| class="wikitable" style="text-align:center"
|+World Chess Championship Match 1998
|-
! !! Rating !! 1 !! 2 !! 3 !! 4 !! 5 !! 6 !! R1 !! R2 !! Points
|-
| align=left |  || 2735
| 1 ||style="background:black; color:white"| 0 || ½ ||style="background:black; color:white"| 1 || ½ ||style="background:black; color:white"| 0 || 1 ||style="background:black; color:white"| 1 || 5
|-
| align=left |  || 2770
|style="background:black; color:white"| 0 || 1 ||style="background:black; color:white"| ½ || 0 ||style="background:black; color:white"| ½ || 1 || style="background:black; color:white"| 0 || 0 || 3
|}

References

External links
Mark Weeks: Groningen Lausanne
Brasilbase

1998
1997 in chess
1998 in chess
Chess in the Netherlands
Chess in Switzerland
Sport in Lausanne
1997 in Dutch sport
1998 in Swiss sport